The Ministry of Rural Welfare is a ministry in the Government of Serbia, created by a vote of the National Assembly of Serbia on 26 October 2020. Milan Krkobabić, the leader of the Party of United Pensioners of Serbia (PUPS), was appointed as minister two days later when Ana Brnabić's second cabinet was constituted and continues to serve in the role as of 2022.

The ministry is generally responsible for ensuring the economic vitality of Serbia's rural communities, many of which (as in other countries) have been declining in population and losing their younger residents to out-migration.

According to its website, the ministry performs "state administration tasks and related professional tasks related to: strategic consideration of the position of the village and the rural population; proposing measures and activities to improve living and working conditions in rural areas; nurturing tradition and traditional way of life in the countryside, in order to preserve the cultural and historical content of rural areas; as well as other activities determined by law."

The ministry is sometimes referred to by the more literal translation, Ministry of Care for the Village. The Serbian government's English-language website, however, uses the name, "Ministry of Rural Welfare."

History
Prior to his appointment as minister of rural welfare, Milan Krkobabić served from 2016 to 2020 as a minister without portfolio in the Serbian government with responsibility for regional affairs. He was already responsible in this time for several aspects of what would become the rural welfare ministry.

In July 2017, Krkobabić announced a significant investment in agricultural co-operatives as a means of ensuring that younger people could choose to remain in rural communities. In July 2018, he reported that 250 such co-operatives had been created in the project's first year. Two years later, he said that the number had increased to 722.

When Krkobabić became a full minister, he indicated that one of his priorities would be organizing the transfer of uncultivated state land to young farmers and young experts. In April 2021, he spoke in favour of creating a "green ring" around Belgrade to supply fresh and healthy food products to several Serbian cities. At the same time, he also announced a program for allocating empty houses, of which he indicated there were around 150,000 in Serbia. Later in the year, he announced that a competition for empty rural houses would begin symbolically after June 28, recognized in Serbia as Vidovdan.

Secretary of State
There is currently one secretary of state in the ministry: Svetozar Aleksov. The secretariat of the ministry is overseen by Snežana Petrović.

Sectors of the ministry
There are currently four sectors in the ministry of rural welfare:

strategic consideration of the position of villages and rural population
improving living and working conditions in the countryside
nurturing traditions in the countryside, preservation of cultural and historical contents, and promotional activities
international co-operation, European integration and projects

List of ministers
Political Party:

References

External links
 

Rural Welfare
2020 establishments in Serbia
Ministries established in 2020